This is a list of notable Josephian, alumni of Saint Joseph's College, Maradana, Sri Lanka.

Politicians

Legal

Religion

Academics

Medicine

Arts

Military

Police

Business

Sports

Notes

References 

 
Saint Joseph's College, Colombo